The Joint Health Command (JHC) is responsible for the delivery of military medicine and joint healthcare services to Australian Defence Force (ADF) personnel, including military psychiatry and rehabilitation services. The JHC is also responsible for providing strategic health policy, the development of the health preparedness of ADF personnel for operations, and the coordination of health units for deployment in support of operations. JHC is led by the dual-hatted Commander Joint Health and Surgeon General of the ADF. 

The Commander Joint Health is responsible to the Chief of Joint Capabilities while deployed health units are responsible to the Chief of Joint Operations. The JHC is staffed by ADF active and reserve personnel, Department of Defence public servants, and contracted health professionals.

History

Pacific Partnership
The Joint Health Command has contributed personnel to the United States Pacific Fleet's Pacific Partnership, a humanitarian assistance initiative, since 2005.

AUSMTF Uruzgan
In 2008, the health personnel from the Australian Army and the Royal Australian Air Force provided two rotations of 10 surgical and intensive care personnel in support of the Dutch Role 2 (Enhanced) Medical Treatment Facility (MTF) also called the Uruzgan Medical Centre located in Kamp Holland within Multi National Base Tarin Kot in Tarin Kowt, the capital of the southern Uruzgan province known as AUSMTF teams.

Role
Joint Health Command (JHC) provides health care to ADF members and ensures the health preparedness of ADF personnel for operations, and, deployable elements of JHC for deployment in support of operations. To effect this, JHC develops strategic health policy, provides strategic level health advice and exercises technical and financial control of ADF health units.

Structure
The JHC is staffed by medical, dental and allied health professionals. These staff may also provide garrison health services to ADF members while they are not on deployment. A total of 1699 health practitioners work in garrison health services comprising 403 public servants, 510 defence personnel, and 786 contractors working on a sessional basis.
The Joint Health Command is made up of the:
Garrison Health Operations Branch which is responsible for the delivery and management of healthcare to ADF personnel within Australia and on non-operational postings overseas.
Mental Health, Psychology and Rehabilitation Branch which provides mental health support across occupational psychology, rehabilitation services, and mental health clinical programs. 
Health Capability Branch which oversees health resources and logistics, pharmacy, workforce development and training, and strategic health capabilities. 
Strategic Health Coordination Branch which oversees family health, health and medical research, and eHealth data and information management. 
Chair of Military Surgery and Medicine is a professional position held jointly at the University of Queensland, the Royal Brisbane and Women's Hospital and the Department of Defence to lead a research program in trauma medicine and surgery relevant to the Australian Defence Force.

Regional Health Services
The JHC's delivery of garrison health services is via a regional structure for medical facilities through Regional Health Servcies (RHS) that provide the basis for healthcare administration. JHC manages 104 garrison health facilities.

Central New South Wales (JHU-CNSW)
Albatross Health Centre
HMAS Creswell
Holsworthy Health Centre
Kuttabul Health Centre
Randwick Health Centre
Tobruk Clinic
Victoria Barracks Clinic Sydney
Watson Clinic

Southern NSW ACT (JHU-SNSW)
Butterworth Clinic
Duntroon Clinic
Duntroon Health Centre
Harman Clinic
Kapooka Health Centre
Kapooka Clinic
Russell Health Centre
Weston Clinic
Wagga Health

Victoria and Tasmania (JHU-VICTAS)
Albury Wodonga Health Centre
Anglesea Clinic
Cerberus Health Clinic
East Sale Health Clinic
Laverton Clinic
Puckapunyal Health Centre
Simpson Health Centre
Victoria Barracks Clinic Melbourne

Western Australia and South Australia (JHU-WASA)
Campbell Health Centre
Edinburgh Health Centre
Keswick Clinic
Leeuwin Health Centre
Pearce Health Centre
Stirling Health Centre
Stirling SUMU Clinic
Taylor Clinic
Woodside Clinic

Northern Territory (JHU-NT)
Darwin Health Centre
Larrakeyah Health Centre
Robertson Health Centre
Tindal Health Centre

Northern Queensland (JHU-NQ)
Cairns Health Centre
Lavarack Health Centre
Lavarack East Clinic
Porton Clinic
Townsville Health Centre
Tully Clinic

South Queensland (JHU-SQ)
Amberley Health Centre
Canungra Clinic
Cabarlah Clinic
Enoggera Clinic
Enoggera Clinic East
Enoggera Health Centre
Oakey Health Centre

Northern New South Wales (JHU-NNSW)
Glenbrook Clinic
Penguin Health Centre
Penguin SUMU Clinic
Richmond Health Centre
Singleton Health Centre
Tamworth Clinic
Waterhen Clinic
Williamtown Health Centre

Surgeons-General

See also
 Royal Australian Army Medical Corps
 RAAF Institute of Aviation Medicine
 Royal Australian Navy School of Underwater Medicine
 Australian Red Cross Blood Service
 Australian Army Medical Women's Service
 List of Australian hospital ships

References

External links
 Australian Defence Organisation website
 Joint Health Command website

Commands of the Australian Defence Force
Military medicine in Australia
Leadership of the Australian Defence Force
Medical units and formations of Australia
Joint military units and formations
Military units and formations established in 2005